The Escala i Corda XVI Professional League 06–07 of the Circuit Bancaixa is the top-level championship of the Valencian pilota, organized by the firm ValNet, on the Escala i corda variant.

It is played in several rounds. The first two ones are a league all-against all; the two worst teams are disqualified. Every victory is worth 3 points, but if the losing team attains 50 jocs they sum up 1 point. This way, in the first round there are eight teams, in the second round there are six teams, and four in the semi-finals. The finals are played to the best of 3 matches.

Teams 
 Alcàsser
 Colau, Jesús and Pigat III
 Benidorm
 Genovés II and Solaz
 L'Eliana
 Álvaro and Tato
 Pedreguer
 Víctor, Fèlix and Salva
 Ajuntament de Petrer
 Miguel and Grau
 Sagunt
 León and Dani
 València
 Núñez, Melchor and Tino
 Vila-real
 Mezquita, Sarasol II and Oñate

Feridors 
 Miguelín and Pedrito

Replacing players 
 Escalaters:
 Adrián I, Cervera, Pedro and Soro III
 Mitgers and punters:
 Bernat, Herrera, Raül II and Voro

Statistics

1st Round

2nd Round

Semi-finals

Finals

Honor gallery  
 Champion:
 València
 Núñez, Melchor and Tino
 Runner-up:
 Vila-real
 Mezquita, Sarasol II and Oñate

Seasons of the Circuit Bancaixa
 Circuit Bancaixa 04/05
 Circuit Bancaixa 05/06
 Circuit Bancaixa 07/08

External links 
 XVI Lliga Professional d'Escala and Corda 06/07
 Tagarinet's webpage

Valencian pilota competitions
Valencian pilota professional leagues